Carlos Alberto Espinoza Loayza (born 23 February 1985) is a Chilean former football goalkeeper. He played for Geelong SC in the Victorian State League Division 2 North-West in Victoria, Australia and previously played for Deportes Puerto Montt and Huachipato in the Chilean Primera División, and for Deportes Puerto Montt and Coquimbo Unido in the Primera B.

Club career
Espinoza began his senior career with Puerto Montt, with whom he spent several seasons playing in the Chilean Primera División. He moved on to Huachipato for the 2009 season, before returning to Puerto Montt for three seasons Primera B seasons, followed by one with Coquimbo Unido.

Espinoza signed for Oakleigh Cannons FC on a short-term basis in September 2015, after impressing for Victorian State League Division 1 side Western Suburbs SC.

Espinoza then moved to Geelong SC in April 2016.

International career
He was a member of the Chile under-20 team at the 2005 FIFA U-20 World Cup: he made one appearance, in the round of 16 as Chile lost 3–0 to the Netherlands.

References

External links
 
 
 Carlos Espinoza at playmakerstats.com (English version of ceroacero.es)

1985 births
Living people
People from Rancagua
Chilean footballers
Chilean expatriate footballers
Chile under-20 international footballers
Association football goalkeepers
Puerto Montt footballers
C.D. Huachipato footballers
Coquimbo Unido footballers
Oakleigh Cannons FC players
North Geelong Warriors FC players
Chilean Primera División players
Primera B de Chile players
Chilean expatriate sportspeople in Australia
Expatriate soccer players in Australia